The  ("tilting vessel" or "tipping vessel") was an ancient Chinese ceremonial utensil that automatically overturned and spilled its contents once it reached capacity, thus symbolizing moderation and caution. Both Confucian and Daoist Chinese classics include a famous anecdote about the first time Confucius saw a tilting vessel. In the Confucian tradition (e.g.) it was also named  ("vessel on the right of one's seat"), with three positions, the vessel tilts to one side when empty, stands upright when filled halfway, and overturns when filled to the brim—illustrating the philosophical value of the golden mean. In the Daoist tradition, the tilting vessel was named  ("urging goblet" or "warning goblet"), with two positions, staying upright when empty and overturning when full—illustrating the metaphysical value of emptiness, and later associated with the Zhuangzian  ("goblet words") rhetorical device.

Terminology

"Phonetic loan characters", using an existing character to be read as a substitution for another of similar or identical pronunciation, have complicated interpreting several "tilting vessel" names. Prior to the Qin dynasty (221–206 BCE) when the process of standardizing Chinese characters began, scribes would use a current Chinese word and character to write another (near-)homophonous word without a standard written form, which often subsequently resulted in the creation of a new character to write the original word and meaning. For example,  from Old Chinese *ʔew ("waist") was borrowed to write  from *ʔew-s "important; want" and the original "waist" sense was later written  semantically clarified with the addition of the "flesh" radical.

The word  ("implement, utensil, instrument; vessel, utensil used as a container or receptacle"), is a recurrent linguistic element in Chinese names and descriptions for tilting vessels.

The  has a final  name,  ("warning vessel") using  ("take precautions against, put on guard; warn(ing), monition").

Textual versions

Six received texts in the Chinese classics mention tilting vessels, four Confucianist (and ) and two Daoist ( and ). Since multiple pre-Han and Han texts incorporated this story, it must have been "very famous" and "widely known" during the Warring States period (475–221 BCE). Since none of these early texts gives any disclaimer regarding the tilting-vessel anecdote's historicity, we may safely assume that people two-thousand years ago believed that Confucius’ temple visit had taken place as described.

In brief, Confucius and his disciples visit a temple with a ritual tilting vessel, Confucius asks the caretaker about its name, says what he has heard about the vessel having three positions, which is confirmed when they pour water into it, then the disciple Zilu (in the four Confucian versions or Zigong in a Daoist version) asks a question about how to keep the tilting vessel full, to which Confucius replies with a list of four to six (depending on the text) positive attributes that should be  ("guarded; maintained; protected") by means of its negative attribute, e.g., "Keen intelligence and sagely wisdom should be guarded by feigning stupidity".

Tilting-vessel accounts in the four Confucian texts are very similar, such as using the hapax legomenon  ("temple caretaker") that is only recorded in these contexts. Note that the 1st century BCE  is omitted from the following discussion because no published English translation is available.

Xunzi
Confucius looked into the ancestral shrine of Duke Huan of Lu, and there was a tipping-vessel there, and Confucius asked of the shrine steward, "What is this vessel?" The steward answered, "This is a 'Vessel to Assist the Throne.'" Confucius said, "I have heard that 'Vessels to Assist the Throne' slant when they are empty, stand upright when half-full, and tip over when full. [, ]" Confucius looked at it and said to his disciples, "Pour water into it." So his disciples brought water and poured it in: it stood upright when half-full, tipped over when full, and then slanted when empty. Confucius heaved a long sigh, and said, "Oh! How could there be that which is full and does not tip over?" Zilu said, "May I ask, is there a Way of maintaining fullness? []" Confucius said, "Perceptiveness and sagely knowledge is to be kept by foolishness, a worldwide achievement is to be kept by yielding, bravery in protecting the world is to be kept by cowardice, the prosperity of the globe is to be kept by modesty, and this is what is called the "Way of Bringing through Losing." []. (24) 
Joseph Needham translates, "This is the Advisory Vessel which stands at the right hand side of the throne", and describes this "famous hydrostatic 'trick' vessel" as a remarkable application of knowledge about centers of gravity. Another translation of this  passage renders the names as "a vessel that inclined to one side" and "a warning vessel".

Kongzi jiayu

The  ("The School Sayings of Confucius") is a collection of ancient pre-Han traditions about Confucius, yet the received text contains some spurious passages apparently interpolated by Wang Su (195–256 CE).

This version of the story uses  (tr. "seat-companion vessel").
Confucius inspected the ancestral temple of Duke Huan of Lu. There was a slanting vessel in it. Confucius asked the temple-warden: "What vessel is this?" He answered, saying: "This must be the seat-companion vessel". Confucius said: "I have heard that the seat-companion vessel slants when empty, stands straight when half filled and overturns when full to the brim. The enlightened rulers considered it a serious warning and therefore they constantly placed it beside their seats". Looking back he said to a disciple: "Try and pour water into it". So they poured water into it: when half filled it stood straight, when full to the brim it overturned [, ]. The Master sighed deeply and said: "Alas! Would there be anything which would not overturn when full to the brim?" Tzu-lu came forward and said: "May I ask if there is a way to keep it filled to the brim? []" The Master said: "Intelligence penetrating [all] wisdom is restrained by stupidity. Meritorious deeds covering the whole world are restrained by the [quality of] giving way. Courage and force shaking the age are restrained by fear. Riches [extending to] the possession of all within the four seas are restrained by modesty. This is what is called the way of "decreasing and again decreasing []".

Han shi waizhuan
Confucius paid a visit to the ancestral temple of Chou, where they had a vessel that leaned at an angle. Confucius asked the caretaker of the temple, "What vessel is that?" The caretaker replied, "Why that, I believe, is a Warning Vessel." Confucius said, "I have heard that a Warning Vessel, when full, turns over, when empty it leans at an angle, and when half full it stands straight. Is this true?" "It is." Confucius had Tzŭ-lu bring water to try it. Full, it turned over; half full, it stood straight; empty, it leaned at an angle [, ]. Confucius heaved a sigh and said, "Ah, does it ever happen that those who are full do not turn over!" Tzŭ-lu said, "I should like to ask whether there is a method for controlling fullness? []" Confucius said, "The method of controlling fullness is to repress and diminish it []." Tzŭ-lu said, "Is there a method for diminishing it?" Confucius said, "Let those whose virtuous conduct is ample preserve it by being reverent. Let those whose territory is extensive preserve it by economy. Let those whose pay is rich and whose rank is elevated preserve them by humility. Let those whose people are many and whose weapons are strong preserve them by fear. Let those possessed of intelligence and knowledge preserve them through [an air of] stupidity. Let those with great learning and strong memories preserve them through [an air of] shallowness. Now this is what I mean by repressing and diminishing []." The Ode says, T'ang was not born too late, and his wisdom and virtue daily advanced". 
Legge translates this passage with "vessel [which was hanging] unevenly [in a frame]" and imprecisely "vessel of the festive board", which refers to the Masonic lodge "festive board" formal dinner involving toasting and singing.

Huainanzi
The c. 139 BCE  ("[Writings of] the Huainan Masters") is a collection of essays by scholars in the court of Liu An, Prince of Huainan. It quotes from many pre-Han schools of thought, including Huang–Lao Daoism, Confucianism, and Legalism.

This Daoist version of the anecdote differs from the Confucian ones in several respects. 
While the Confucian texts give the three-position vessel description twice, when it is first seen and after the water pouring experiment, the  only gives the two-position description it in the second context. 
The questioning disciple is identified as Zigong instead of Zilu. This textual version adds two quotes not found in the other versions. It quotes Confucius that "Things prosper then decline ..." referring to the sun and moon, and quotes Laozi ( 15).
Master Kong was paying a visit to the temple of Duke Huan when he happened to catch sight of a vessel called a Warning Vessel. "How wonderful to have caught sight of such a vessel!" "Master Kong exclaimed in delight. He turned his head around toward his disciples and called out: "Disciples, fetch some water!" When they brought the water, Master Kong poured it into the vessel. When the vessel was half full, it remained upright, but when Master Kong filled it completely, it toppled over on its side [, ]. Suddenly Master Kong's expression changed, and he exclaimed: "How splendid to grasp the significance of fullness [ ]." Standing at the master's side, Zigong said: "Please, what does it mean 'to grasp the significance of fullness'? "What increases will decrease," replied Master Kong. "What does that mean?" asked Zigong. Master Kong replied: "Things prosper then decline. Joy reaches its utmost then becomes sorrow. The sun reaches its apogee then shifts. The moon reaches its fullness then begins to wane. This is why the perceptive and wise preserve themselves with stupidity; the learned and eloquent preserve themselves with restraint; the martial and courageous preserve themselves with timidity; the wealthy and powerful preserve themselves with frugality; and those whose Potency operates throughout the world preserve themselves with docility. These five things are the means by which the former kings defended their empires without losing them. If you oppose these five things, you will always be endangered." Therefore the Laozi says: "If you submit to the Way, you will not want to be full. It is because he is not full that he can be worn and yet newly made" (12.55).

Wenzi
Instead of associating tilting vessels with Duke Huan of Lu, this version instead names the Three Sovereigns and Five Emperors, a collective name for legendary Chinese sage-rulers, 

"The ancient monarchs had a warning-vessel, called an 'urging goblet.' This righted itself when poured out, and turned over when filled [，]."

History
Chinese histories record that the tipping-vessel was an exclusively elite object that finally disappeared during the turbulent end of the Han dynasty (189–220). Details about the last authentic Zhou dynasty tipping vessel are found in the Book of Jin biography of general Du Yu, which recounts that around 260 CE he attempted to reconstruct a  but had difficulties: "The tipping-vessel of the Zhou ancestral shrine was still by the throne when the Han came to the Eastern Capital. In the chaos at the end of the Han, it was kept no longer, and [knowledge of the] form and construction were lost." Later dynastic histories similarly record attempts to recreate the ancient vessels. According to the History of the Southern Dynasties, the mathematician and inventor Zu Chongzhi successfully reconstructed a  vessel during the reign-period of Yongming (483–493). The astronomer and mathematician Zu Chongzhi (429–500) made more tilting vessels. Xue Cheng made elaborate ones in 538, and the engineer Geng Xun also made them in 605. Around 790 Li Gao (733–792), the Tang Prince of Cao, produced numerous lacquerware tipping vessels. The latest tipping-vessel example is when the Guangxu Emperor had one manufactured 1889, and that artifact is now at the Palace Museum in Beijing.

During the Abbasid Caliphate, tilting vessels "aroused the keen interest" of Persian scholars, who "greatly developed their possibilities", as seen in Banu Musa's 850 Book of Ingenious Devices, which described many types of automata, such as valves that open and close by themselves.

The Chinese  ("tipping vessel") was adapted for a technologically sophisticated Korean water clock during the Joseon dynasty (1392–1897). King Sejong the Great (r. 1418–1450) ordered the inventor Jang Yeong-sil to develop two automated water clocks. The 1434  was the national standard clock in the Gyeongbokgung Palace. The 1438  was an astronomical clock that displayed the movements of celestial bodies and changes of seasons with both visual and audible time signals. It had an overflow tube that transferred surplus water to a miniature waterfall, pond, and tilting vessel.

Modern interpretations
The sinologist and translator D. C. Lau analyzed all six versions of the tilting-vessel story, and found that the descriptions of whether the container had two or three positions provided a historical key for the direction of borrowing.

The  and  say: "Full, it turned over; half full, it stood straight; empty, it tilted", while the  reversed the order to describe filling the vessel: "Empty, it tilted; half full, it stood straight; full, it turned over". The other three texts record two positions. The Confucian  text says: "Half full, it stood straight; full, it turned over". There was a naming taboo on writing the given name Ying of Emperor Hui of Han (r. 195–188 BCE). The  says: "When it was half full, it remained upright; when it was full, it turned over". The  variant  ( "empty") changes our understanding: "When it was empty, it remained upright, when it was full, it turned over".

Lau differentiates the Daoist and Confucian versions of the tilting-vessel anecdote. In the simpler Daoist two-position version, the legendary vessel is upright when "empty" ( or ) and overturns when "full" ( or ). In this way, not only was the Daoist ideal of emptiness transformed into the Confucian advocacy of moderation, but the added statement further reduced emptiness from being the supreme Daoist virtue to being merely one of two extremes.

The commentary of Guo Xiang (252–312 CE) says, "A [] (wine cup), when full, overturns, and when empty, faces upwards". It adapts itself to things and is not something which holds rigidly to one thing and abides by what happened in the past." The first part of Guo's commentary is almost identical with the  version, and Lau notes two points. Both sources describe a vessel with only two positions: it overturns when full and faces upwards when empty. Guo Xiang unambiguously describes it with the word  ("empty"), which, unlike  ("middle"), is not open to "deliberate misinterpretation". Lau's "important" article convincingly shows that Guo Xiang used the Daoist version of the tipping vessel story.

In Lau's interpretation, the Daoist version of the story neither mentions a third half-fuIl position of the vessel, nor mentions the word  ("tilt") either. Having inserted the sentence "when it was empty it tilted", the Confucian editor clinched the matter by calling it the "tilting vessel". In the Daoist version, the vessel is upright when empty and overturns when full, thus illustrating the value of emptiness. In the Confucian version, this was changed so that the vessel is upright when half full, overturns when full, and tilts when empty, thus illustrating the value of the mean.

The  uses the word  while the four Confucian texts use  in accordance with the imperial naming taboo. In the Daoist version, the term  meant "to fill by holding", e.g., the  describes "to grasp the significance of fullness". For the Confucians, their own term  meant "to maintain a state of fullness", the  describes a "method for controlling fullness". This was changed into  ("The method of controlling fullness is to repress and diminish it), which describes the way to attain  in the Confucian sense. The expression  is further explained in the Daoist version by the passage in which the general principle is stated that things when they reach the highest point of development will decline. This was changed by the substitution of a passage which states the principle derived from the Book of Changes that fullness can be maintained by guarding a positive attribute by means of its negative attribute. Lau concludes that the tilting vessel anecdote is an insightful example of how “a story which belonged originally to a particular school can come to be adopted, with modifications, by another”.

Daniel Fried, professor of Chinese and comparative literature at the University of Alberta, combined Chinese textual and archeological evidence to propose a "speculative history" of the Zhuangzian  "goblet" trope, associating it with the Zhou dynasty (c. 1046–256 BCE)  ("tipping vessel") designed to tilt and empty when filled to capacity, and ultimately with a Yangshao culture (c. 5000-c. 4000 BCE) irrigation vessel that would tip over automatically. The Leiden University scholar Paul van Els describes Fried's paper as "an insightful discussion of the vessel’s various uses, with illustrations of the object". This hypothesis has three diachronic stages: agricultural-"", tipping-zhi, and jade-zhi.

The first agricultural-"" period began when ancient farmers in late Neolithic China developed an irrigation tool (the prehistoric name of this device is unknown, and Fried extends "" emblematically) that used ropes and ceramic amphora with handles below the center of gravity. It facilitated evenly irrigating large fields, and proved so useful that it continued to be used for thousands of years. In the 1950s, Chinese archeologists excavating the Banpo site in Shaanxi discovered narrow-mouthed, narrow-bottomed amphora jugs dating from the Yangshao culture (c. 5000-c. 3000 BCE). Huang Chongyue and Sun Xiao, researchers at the Banpo Museum, published a series of articles based on experiments with the amphoras. The use of the vessel in irrigation "was driven by its ability to deliver a constant, low-flow stream of water, without the attention of the farmer, who held strings attached to the handles while the jugs tipped over of themselves". Fried speculates that advances in agricultural technology, such as the introduction of the water-raising well-sweep into China around the 5th century BCE, may have caused farmers to discontinue using the ceramic tipping-vessels for irrigation.

Rulers adopted the intriguing irrigation device for its symbolic meaning that warned against excess. By the late Warring States period (c. 475–221 BCE), this seemingly "automated" tilting vessel was credited with enough cultural significance, or at least "value as a curiosity", to be displayed in the ancestral shrine of Duke Huan of Lu (d. 694 BCE), which seemed plausible to the redactors of both Daoist and Confucian classics. Although Confucius (d. 479 BCE) had previously heard of the tipping-zhi, he had never seen one until visiting Huan's shrine, which implies that they had not been in common use for centuries during the Eastern Zhou period. Around the time when popular usage of the tipping-zhi was dying out, Zhuangzi (d. c. 286) metaphorically described his own style of speech with  signifying both instability and timelessness.

Fried's third stage of jade-zhi was first recorded in late Western Han texts that described valuable  ("jade goblets"). Sima Qian's c. 91 BCE Records of the Grand Historian usually mentioned them in contexts of highly formal occasions, often in conjunction with toasts for longevity or ritual dedications. For instance, the history of Xiang Yu (232–202 BCE) says, "The Earl of Xiang went in to see the Duke of Pei. The Duke of Pei raised a goblet of wine to his health, and proposed a marriage [between their houses]." Or, the history of Emperor Gaozu (r. 202–195 BCE) says, "When the Weiyang Palace was completed, Emperor Gaozu assembled the nobles and ministers, and had wine set out in the Anterior Hall of the Weiyang Palace. Then Gaozu raised a jade goblet, and toasted the health of the Taishang Huang (his father Liu Taigong)." In later Chinese literature, the word  continued to have a decorous, high-class connotation, regularly in connection with toasts for long life. For example, the Tang poet Zhang Ji wrote, "I place a jade goblet full of wine and, bowing, wish you immortality".

In the context of Du Yu's frustrating attempt to reconstruct a  tipping vessel without a working model, the Book of Jin says the last surviving one was lost by the end of the Han in 220 CE, and it was exclusively a royal regalia by that point. If it had been regularly used, "its form would have been common knowledge, and hence not susceptible to sudden loss". "Goblet words come forth daily," but the jade-zhi of the mainstream tradition is not a container for daily use, it is a special goblet for elite usage on ceremonial occasions.

Fried does not cite Lau who studied all known versions of the anecdote about the tipping vessel in Duke Huan's shrine, and dichotomized between earlier Daoist two-position versions and later Confucian three-position versions. He presumes that both Guo Xiang and the  redactor changed the original  formulation describing a three-position vessel (upright, inclining, or flipped) and edited it to describe a two-position one (self-righting or self-tipping). For the "most difficult to understand" phrase in the  description, "it is upright when half-full", Guo simply eliminated it from his  commentary, and the  redactor assumed a loan-character substitution, meaning that the vessel "pours out and is righted". Fried describes this as the sort of editing that one would make when no more such vessels are known through experience, and the interpreter is "attempting to deal with a received formulation".

Van Els disagrees with Lau's hypothesis that the Daoist version (e.g. ) was the original anecdote, which was borrowed into Confucian writings (e.g. ) and transformed to suit their teachings. Lau sees a significant inconsistency in the Confucian versions that promote techniques for maintaining complete fullness, whereas the vessel's overflowing serves to illustrate that fullness cannot be maintained. Van Els sees it differently. The  version of the anecdote mentions only two stages of the vessel (half full and full). Since logically speaking, filling a vessel involves three stages (empty, full, and anything in between), one would therefore reasonably expect the story to include the empty stage.

See also
 Pythagorean cup

References
 
 
 
 
 
 
 
 Footnotes'''

Further reading
 Karlgren, Bernhard (1968), Loan Characters in Pre-Han Texts, Museum of Far Eastern Antiquities.
 Kirby, Christopher (2019), "Goblet Words and Moral Knack: Non-Cognitive Moral Realism in the ?", in Colin Marshall, ed., Comparative Metaethics: Neglected Perspectives on the Foundations of Morality, Routledge, 159–178.

External links
Confucius Taught Using the Analogy of a Warning Vessel, Vision China Times'', 2 December 2014.

Chinese iconography
Chinese inventions
Chinese pottery
History of ceramics